Brantford Transit is a public transit service serving Brantford, Ontario, Canada. It operates bus service for almost 1.3 million passengers per year.

Services 
Regular routes operate on a half-hour schedule from the downtown terminal. 

Monday to Saturday services (6:00am - 9:00pm)
 1 Eagle Place
 2 West Street - Brier Park
 4A/4C Mall Link
 5 West Brant - Oakhill
 6 West Brant - Shellard Lane
 7 East Ward - Braneida
 8 Holmedale - Mayfair (with peak hour extension to Northwest Industrial)
 9 Echo Place/ Lynden Rd

Evening (9:00pm - 1:00am) and Sunday services (8:30am – 6:30pm)
 11 West Brant - Oakhill/ NWIA Holmedale
 12 Eagle Place/ West Brant - Shellard Lane
 13 King George Rd/ Brantwood Park
 14 Echo Place/ East Ward
 15 West Street/ Mayfair

Additional school service is provided to Assumption College, Brantford Collegiate Institute, North Park, Pauline Johnson, St. John's, Tollgate Technological Skills Centre, and Wilfrid Laurier University. 

Brantford Transit connects with regional transit and intercity services at the Brantford Transit Terminal, where GO Transit bus route 15 connects the city to stops in Hamilton before terminating at Aldershot GO Station in Burlington.

History 
Public transit began in Brantford in 1886 with horse drawn cars which by 1893 had been converted to electric. The City of Brantford took over these operations in 1914. The Public Utilities Commission was formed in 1935 by amalgamating the Hydro Electric Commission, the Board of Water Commissioners and the Municipal Railway Commission. Around 1936 buses began to replace street cars and by the end of 1939 the change over was complete.

During the early 1980s Brantford Transit introduced painted buses other than the normal cream and maroon livery. You could find such things as the Minolta Bus, Parsons, Whirlpool, Zenith to name a few. These rolling advertisements were the forerunners of today's ad wrapped buses you see now in Brantford and other cities.

The fleet colours were also changed to white, black, blue and red.

Fleet

Historically, the bus fleet of Brantford Transit consisted of a mix of GM New Looks, Classics, Orion V, Orion VII, ElDorado National, Nova Bus LFS and Blue Bird Ultra LF.

See also

 Public transport in Canada

References

External links 
 
 Drawings and photos of Brantford Transit buses

Transit agencies in Ontario
Transport in Brantford